Vincent "Ballyfermot" Jackson (born 1 March 1966) is an Irish independent politician who has served as a Dublin City Councillor since May 1991. He previously served as Lord Mayor of Dublin from June 2006 to June 2007.
 
Originally a carpenter by profession, he became involved with a variety of community and youth projects in Ballyfermot in Dublin. He first contested the 1991 local elections where he was elected to Dublin City Council representing the Ballyfermot local electoral area. He was re-elected at the 1999, 2004 and 2009 elections. He unsuccessfully stood for Dáil Éireann at the 1992, 1997 and 2002 general elections.
He was elected Lord Mayor of Dublin in 2006, with the backing of Fianna Fáil, Sinn Féin and a number of independent councillors.

References

 

1966 births
Living people
Lord Mayors of Dublin
Independent politicians in Ireland
Alumni of Dublin Institute of Technology